John Vickers is a British economist and the Warden of All Souls College, Oxford.

John Vickers or Jon Vickers may also refer to:

 Jack Vickers (1908–1980), English footballer
 John Vickers (criminal) (died 1957), British convict executed for murder
 Jon Vickers (1926–2015), Canadian operatic tenor
 Jon Vickers (rugby union) (born 1988), English rugby union player
 Jon Vickers (trade unionist) (1916–2008), English trade union leader

See also 
 John McVicker (born 1868), Irish footballer
 Vickers (disambiguation)